Ftira is a ring-shaped, leavened, Maltese bread, usually eaten with fillings such as sardines, tuna, potato, fresh tomato, onion, capers and olives. Regional variations include Gozo ftira, which is served more like a pizza than a sandwich. Gozitan ftira is served open with thinly sliced potato over the crust, or folded over like a calzone.

Intangible Cultural Heritage
Following the Maltese Parliament's unanimous approval to ratify UNESCO's Convention for the Safeguarding of the Intangible Cultural Heritage, in 2018 Malta's Culture Directorate launched a petition to include the Maltese ftira as part of UNESCO's Intangible Cultural Heritage (ICH) list. According to a local expert, 'The Making of the Ftira Maltija', as it is listed in the Directorate's National Inventory, dates back to the Sixteenth Century. Following a strong public call, the Government of Malta announced that it would be submitting the Maltese ftira to UNESCO for consideration as intangible cultural heritage. In 2020, the Maltese ftira was added to UNESCO's Intangible Cultural Heritage List.

See also
 Maltese cuisine
 List of Maltese dishes

References

Maltese cuisine
Breads
National dishes